Marvin Watts (born 21 May 1975) is a retired Jamaican athlete who specialised in the 800 metres. He won several medals at the regional level. He competed at the 2000 Summer Olympics reaching semifinals.

His personal best in the event is 1:46.43 from 2001.

Competition record

References

1975 births
Living people
Jamaican male middle-distance runners
Olympic athletes of Jamaica
Athletes (track and field) at the 2000 Summer Olympics
Pan American Games competitors for Jamaica
Athletes (track and field) at the 2003 Pan American Games
Commonwealth Games competitors for Jamaica
Athletes (track and field) at the 1998 Commonwealth Games
Athletes (track and field) at the 2002 Commonwealth Games
World Athletics Championships athletes for Jamaica
South Carolina Gamecocks men's track and field athletes
Central American and Caribbean Games bronze medalists for Jamaica
Competitors at the 2002 Central American and Caribbean Games
Central American and Caribbean Games medalists in athletics
20th-century Jamaican people
21st-century Jamaican people